Rimrock Lake is located in Grand Teton National Park, in the U. S. state of Wyoming. The lake is within a cirque on the north side of Prospectors Mountain and is situated above the south side of Death Canyon.

References

Lakes of Grand Teton National Park